Rana Amr Adly Abdel Aziz Hamdy (born 11 September 1989), also known as Rana Abdel Aziz, is a footballer who plays as a centre back. She has been a member of the Egypt women's national team.

College career
From 2013 to 2015, she attended George Brown College where she played for the women's soccer team. In 2013, she was an OCAA League All-Star. In 2014, she was recognized last year for her work in the classroom and on the field, winning the Michael ‘Pinball’ Clemons award, while also being named and Ontario Colleges Athletic Association League All-Star and being awarded a Special Recognition Award. In 2015, she was named Female Athlete of the Year, earned a Contribution to Athletics Award and was the Women’s Outdoor Soccer MVP.

Club career
In 2018 and 2019, Hamdy played for Oakville Blue Devils FC in Canada in League1 Ontario. She won the league title with Oakville in 2019 becoming one of the first Egyptian women, along with teammate Mahira Ali to win a domestic league title.

In 2022, she played for Burlington SC in League1 Ontario.

International career
Hamdy played for Egypt at senior level during the 2016 Africa Women Cup of Nations.

References

1989 births
Living people
Egyptian women's footballers
Women's association football central defenders
Egypt women's international footballers
Egyptian Muslims
Soccer players from Toronto
Sportspeople from North York
York Lions soccer players
George Brown College alumni
Blue Devils FC (women) players
League1 Ontario (women) players
Canadian people of Egyptian descent
Canadian Muslims
Burlington SC (League1 Ontario) players